Tinlicker is a Dutch electronic music group from Utrecht comprising Micha Heyboer and Jordi van Achthoven. Formed in 2012, they have released music on labels such as Anjunadeep, mau5trap, Astralwerks, and Armada. They have played festivals including Mysteryland, Creamfields, Tomorrowland, and Ultra.

History
Tinlicker started as a solo project of Micha Heyboer (born 14 May 1979 in Utrecht, The Netherlands) on his own Zero Three Zero label, beginning with the release of the It's My First Time Here EP (7 December 2012) and the subsequent release of the Remember The Future album (8 April 2013).

Through a mutual contact, Jordi van Achthoven (born 4 June 1983 in Gouda, The Netherlands) connected with Micha in 2014. Both artists were inspired by Paul Kalkbrenner, Trentemøller, and Moderat. They decided to continue as a duo and started working with Feed Me's Sotto Voce label. They released three EP's with Feed Me: Like No Other (1 December 2014), Into The Open (14 April 2015), and The Space In Between including "Oudegracht" (4 September 2015). The latter garnered significant online attention.

Toolroom sublabel Zerothree released "Maandag" on 5 February 2016. Above & Beyond premiered it on their Group Therapy radio show. Later in 2016, Zerothree released the Automatic EP, including "In All The Fire", which premiered on Data Transmission.

Tinlicker began 2017 with "Soon You'll Be Gone", their debut release on Anjunadeep. Later in the year, Tinlicker signed a deal with booking agency David Lewis Productions, who booked them a show on the mainstage of Mysteryland. "Because You Move Me" was released by Armada and with the Jalapeño EP, their collaboration with the label of deadmau5 got a follow-up. "Nothing Without You" and remixes for Lane 8 and Gabriel & Dresden settled Tinlicker as an Anjunadeep act in 2018. They returned on mau5trap with the About You EP and a collaboration with Lane 8 before signing an album deal in London with Anjuna.

Introduced by the singles "Lost", "Breezeblocks", and "Need You", the This Is Not Our Universe full-length album, featuring vocals by alt-J, Run Rivers, Thomas Oliver, and Belle Doron, was released on 27 September 2019 and reached number 1 on the dance album charts in the United States, Australia, India, Canada, and Finland and number 2 in the United Kingdom, the Netherlands, and Poland.

Spring 2020 saw the release of the This Is Not Our Universe remixes, with album tracks reworked by Dosem, Joris Delacroix, and Grum. Tinlicker perform worldwide and host their own bi-monthly Remember The Future club night in their hometown of Utrecht at the venue TivoliVredenburg. Other 2020 highlights were the release of the Paradise EP on Astralwerks and the remix of the Robert Miles classic "Children", which reached the number 1 position on Beatport in November. In early 2021, Tinlicker released a collaboration with Ben Böhmer on Anjunadeep.

Discography

Albums 

 Remember The Future (ZTZ, 2013)
 This Is Not Our Universe (Anjunabeats, 2019)
 This Is Not Our Universe – The Remixes (Anjunabeats, 2020)
 In Another Lifetime (Anjunadeep, 2022)

Singles and EPs
 Like No Other EP (Sotto Voce, 2014)
 The Space In Between EP (Sotto Voce, 2015)
 Into The Open EP (Sotto Voce, 2015)
 "Maandag (Zerothree, 2016)
 "In All The Fire" (Zerothree, 2016)
 "Soon You'll Be Gone" (Anjunadeep, 2017)
 "Because You Move Me" (Armada, 2017)
 Jalapeño EP (Mau5trap, 2017)
 "Shadowing" / "Motion" (Zerothree, 2017)
 "Nothing Without You" (Anjunadeep, 2018)
 "If I Was" / "Wanderer" (Armada, 2018)
 "Dream With Somebody" (Armada, 2018)
 About You EP (mau5trap, 2019)
 "Anthracite" (Anjunadeep, 2019)
 "Lost" (Anjunabeats, 2019)
 "Breezeblocks" (Anjunabeats, 2019)
 "Need You" (Anjunabeats, 2019)
 "Sleepwalker" (Anjunadeep, 2020)
 "Paradise" (Astralwerks, 2020)
 "Tell Me" (Be Yourself, 2020)
 "Run Away" (Anjunadeep, 2021)
 "Lost Gravity" (Anjunadeep, 2021)
 "Be Here and Now" (Anjunadeep, 2021)
 Hypnotized / I Can Feel featuring Dosem (Anjunadeep, 2021)
 "You Take My Hand" featuring Jamie Irresponsible (Anjunadeep, 2021)
 "Just To Hear You Say" featuring Nathan Nicholson (Anjunadeep, 2022)
 "Healing Forest" (Anjunadeep, 2022)

Remixes

 "Higher" (David Douglas, 2015)
 "Never Leave Me" (Petter Carlsen. 2015)
 "Small Room" (Nato Medrado, 2017)
 "Underwater" (Gabriel & Dresden, 2018)
 "Clarify" (Lane 8, 2018)
 "Need To Feel Loved" (Reflekt, 2019)
 "Breezeblocks" (Alt-J, 2019)
 "Luxuria" (Deadmau5, 2019)
 "The Healing" (James Zabiela, 2020)
 "W.T.F." (Moon Boots, 2020)
 "Wherever You Are" (Nils Hoffmann, 2020)
 "Children" (Robert Miles, 2020)
 "Let Go" (The Irrepressibles, 2021)
 "Hide U" (Kosheen, 2021)

References 

Musical groups established in 2012
Dutch electronic music groups
Mau5trap artists
Astralwerks artists
Armada Music artists
Anjunabeats artists
Dutch musical duos
Progressive house musicians
Deep house musicians